Neal Potter (March 22, 1915 – May 27, 2008) was an American Democratic politician from Maryland. He served as fourth executive of Montgomery County, Maryland, from 1990 to 1994.

Early life and education
Alfred Neal Potter grew up in Montgomery County, the son of Alden A. and Charlotte Waugh Potter, and graduated from Bethesda-Chevy Chase High School. Potter's early interest in engineering changed to economics and political science when he entered Johns Hopkins University in 1933. He received his B.A. (Phi Beta Kappa) and M.A. in political science and economics from the University of Minnesota. He went on to perform graduate work in public finance at the University of Chicago.

Career
An economist with the U.S. Office of Price Administration from 1941 to 1946, he went on to teach economics at Carnegie Tech (now Carnegie Mellon University) in Pittsburgh, Pennsylvania, from 1946 to 1947, and at Washington State College in Pullman, Washington, from 1947 to 1951. Potter held the post of Western Field Director for the World Federalists organization from 1952 to 1954, and in 1955 joined Resources of the Future, Inc. serving as a research associate until 1974. His publications include: Trends in U.S. Natural Resource Commodities 1870-1957, World Prospects for Natural Resources, Natural Resource Potential of the Antarctic, written after an expedition to the Antarctic, and contributions to Goals, Priorities, and Dollars, and The Population Dilemma.

Prior to his election to the Montgomery County Council, Potter was involved in a variety of civic activities. In 1960, he was the principal organizer of the Citizens Committee for Fair Taxation. He served as president of the Montgomery County Citizens Planning Association (1965 to 1967) and as its editor (1968 to 1969). He also served as co-chairman of the Metropolitan Washington Coalition for Clean Air, as a board member of the Capital Area United Nations Association, and as vice president of the World Federalist Organization.

Montgomery County, Maryland
First elected to the County Council in 1970, he won reelection in all subsequent election years until 1990, serving three times as Council president. Running for the office of County Executive in 1990, Potter defeated incumbent Sidney Kramer in the Democratic primaries and served one term in that position from 1990 to 1994. In 1994 he returned to the legislative branch of County government, having been elected Council member-at-large.

During his tenure as Council member, Potter played a leading role in Council actions on controlling development, fiscal affairs, tax legislation, sewage and transportation issues, and assessment inequities. While on the Council, he sponsored bills to establish the Office of Public Advocate for Assessments and Taxation, and the Montgomery County Conservation Corps. In addition, he authored Council-sponsored State legislation on taxation, farmland preservation, and farmland assessment. Potter was also instrumental in the formation of the Home Purchase Cost Investigation Committee.

Potter had served as president of the Metropolitan Washington Council of Governments and on several committees for the National Association of Counties (NACO), and the Maryland Association of Counties. His numerous memberships include Americans for Democratic Action, the Audubon Naturalist Society, the Chevy Chase United Methodist Church, and Common Cause. He was a member of the NAACP and SANE/FREEZE, and continued to be a member of the Capital Area United Nations Association and the World Federalist Association, Citizens for Global Solutions for the remainder of his life.

Death
Potter died on May 27, 2008, of congestive heart failure at Asbury Methodist Village in Gaithersburg, Maryland. He was survived by his wife, Marion, his daughter Joanne, his brother, Lloyd (Buzz), and his grandson, Barry. He was predeceased by a daughter, Freida.

Awards and decorations
Honors presented to Potter since he entered public office included the Governor's Citation, the Council of Governments' Metropolitan Public Service Award, and the Sentinel newspaper's Citizen of the Year award. He was also a recipient of NACO's Distinguished Service Award, the Audubon Naturalist Society's Legislator of the Year award, and the Montgomery County Civic Federation's Citation for Distinguished Public Service.

In 2018 a plaza along the Capital Crescent Trail at River Road was named for him.

References

External links
 Neal Potter (1915-2008) at the Maryland State Archives
 Obituary: Neal Potter, 93; Montgomery Leader Stood for Slow Growth published in The Washington Post
 Neal Potter (1990-1994) at MontgomeryCountyMD.GOV

Montgomery County, Maryland Executives
1915 births
University of Minnesota College of Liberal Arts alumni
2008 deaths
Bethesda-Chevy Chase High School alumni
20th-century American politicians
Maryland Democrats
University of Chicago Booth School of Business alumni